Héctor Codevila  (born 23 January 1964 in Montevideo) is a former Uruguayan football player and manager.

Club career
Codevila played for Rampla Juniors, Liverpool de Montevideo and Rentistas in the Primera División Uruguaya. He also played for Deportivo Italiano in the Primera B Nacional Argentina and finished his playing career with Deportivo Cuenca in Serie A de Ecuador.

References

1964 births
Living people
Uruguayan footballers
Rampla Juniors players
Liverpool F.C. (Montevideo) players
C.D. Cuenca footballers
Uruguayan football managers
Footballers from Montevideo
Expatriate footballers in Argentina

Association football midfielders